Ambassador of Iraq to the United Nations, more formally known as "Permanent Representative of the Republic of Iraq" leads Iraq delegation to the United Nations in New York City.

The current representative is Zardasht Abdulla Muhammad.

Office holders 
The following is a chronological list of those who have held the office:

See also 
 Foreign relations of Iraq
 List of current Permanent Representatives to the United Nations

References

External links 
  Website of the Permanent Mission of the Republic of Iraq to the United Nations
  Republic of Iraq's Ministry of Foreign Affairs website
 Permanent Mission of the Republic of Iraq to the United Nations  Facebook page

See also
 Foreign Relations of Iran

 
Iraq
1952 births
Living people